Rubens Bassini (January 26, 1933 in Rio de Janeiro – September 1985)  was a percussionist, who played bongos and congas above all. He played together with the band Os Ipanemas: Astor Silva; (trombone), Marinho (bass), Wilson das Neves (drums) and Neco (guitar).

He also played with Judy Collins, João Gilberto, Sérgio Mendes, Chuck Mangione, Dom Salvador, Carly Simon, Spyro Gyra, Eumir Deodato and Dave Grusin, predominantly Bossa Nova.

Discography
Rubens Bassini E Os 11 Magnificos 1960 Rio de Janeiro, Brasil re- issued 2002
Rubens Bassini Y Los Latinos 1963 Rio de Janeiro, Brasil re -issued 2010
Rubens Bassini with Sérgio Mendes and Brasil '66, 77, 88 
Deodato - Deodato 2 - 1973 (CTI Records)
The Atlantic Family Live at Montreux - 1976 (Atlantic Records)

As sideman
With Herbie Mann
Brazil: Once Again (Atlantic, 1977)
With Chuck Mangione
Main Squeeze (A&M, 1976)
With Jimmy McGriff
Tailgunner (LRC, 1977)
With Don Sebesky
Giant Box (CTI, 1973)
With The Spinners
Dancin' and Lovin' (Atlantic, 1979)
With Stanley Turrentine
Don't Mess with Mister T. (CTI, 1973)
With Vince Guaraldi
Alma-Ville (Warner Bros.-Seven Arts, 1969)

References

Brazilian percussionists
1933 births
1985 deaths
Bongo players
Conga players
Maracas players
Timbaleros
Triangle players
Tambourine players
Brazilian session musicians
Brazilian expatriates in the United States
Musicians from Rio de Janeiro (city)
20th-century Brazilian musicians
20th-century drummers
Sergio Mendes and Brasil '66 members